Viktor Anatoliyovych Yastrebov (born 13 January 1982 in Nadvirna) is a Ukrainian triple jumper.

He finished seventh in the triple jump final at the 2006 European Athletics Championships in Gothenburg.

He also competed in the 2004 Summer Olympics but failed to progress from his pool.

Competition record

External links 

1982 births
Living people
Ukrainian male triple jumpers
Athletes (track and field) at the 2004 Summer Olympics
Olympic athletes of Ukraine
Universiade medalists in athletics (track and field)
People from Nadvirna
Universiade silver medalists for Ukraine
Medalists at the 2003 Summer Universiade
Sportspeople from Ivano-Frankivsk Oblast